Cermeño is a surname. Notable people with the surname include:

Antonio Cermeño (1969–2014), Venezuelan boxer
Carlos Cermeño (born 1995), Venezuelan footballer
Fernando Cermeño (born 1980), Spanish actor and model
Nehomar Cermeño (born 1979), Venezuelan boxer
Sebastian Rodriguez Cermeño (1560-1602), Portuguese explorer who shipwrecked in Drake's Bay, California in 1595